Wayne Closter (born 26 February 1945) is a former Australian rules footballer who played for Geelong in the Victorian Football League (VFL).

Closter played as both a wingman and centreman during his 191-game career, missing out on joining the 200 club due to National Service training commitments and a tour of duty fighting in Vietnam.

He was however in 2007 inducted into the club along with his teammate Joe Sellwood and Essendon's Jack Jones who both served as well.

Footnotes

References

External links

1945 births
Living people
Australian rules footballers from Victoria (Australia)
Geelong Football Club players
Australian military personnel of the Vietnam War